Xylecata is a genus of tiger moths in the family Erebidae.

Species
Xylecata biformis
Xylecata crassiantennata
Xylecata druna
Xylecata glauce
Xylecata hemixantha
Xylecata rattrayi
Xylecata ugandicola
Xylecata uniformis
Xylecata xanthura

References
Natural History Museum Lepidoptera generic names catalog

Nyctemerina
Moth genera